The following is a list of notable events and releases of the year 1893 in Norwegian music.

Events

Deaths

Births

 July
 4 – Finn Bø, songwriter, revue writer, playwright, journalist and theatre critic (died 1962).

 December
 13 – Olav Gurvin, musicologist and Professor at the University of Oslo (died 1974).

See also
 1893 in Norway
 Music of Norway

References

 
Norwegian music
Norwegian
Music
1890s in Norwegian music